Guarin or Guarín is a surname. Notable people with the surname include:

Christopher Guarin (ca. 1970 – 2012), Filipino journalist
Fredy Guarín (born 1986), Colombian footballer
Hugh Patrick Guarin Maule (1873 – 1940), British architect
Percy Guarin (born ?), former Filipino footballer

See also
 Guarin, Italian chaplain and chancellor